Twilight Curtains is a rarities compilation album by Truly. It was released only in the UK, on May 22, 2000.

Track listing
 "Twilight Curtains" - 4:41
 "Leatherette Tears II" - 3:31
 "Aliens on Alcohol" - 4:51
 "Wait Til' the Night" - 4:52
 "I Hit Ignition" - 5:32
 "Our Lips Are Sealed" - 2:45 (The Go Go's)
 "Girl Don't Tell Me You'll Write" - 2:30 (The Beach Boys)
 "Queen of the Girls" - 3:54
 "20th Century Voluntary Slaves" - 5:21
 "Mellotronica Symphonica" - 3:10

References

Truly albums
2000 compilation albums
Grunge compilation albums